Clarksburg School may refer to:

Clarksburg School (Clarksburg, Maryland), listed on the National Register of Historic Places in Montgomery County, Maryland
Clarksburg School (Clarksburg, New Jersey), listed on the National Register of Historic Places in Monmouth County, New Jersey